Jevgeni Ossinovski (born 15 March 1986) is an Estonian politician, former leader of the Estonian Social Democratic Party.

Early life and education
He is the son of Oleg Ossinovski (et), a prominent railway industrialist who moved to Estonia from Kazakhstan in the 1980s.

London School of Economics and Political Science has awarded him MSc in Comparative Politics (with Distinction) in 2010.

Political career
Ossinovski was the Minister of Education and Research from 26 March 2014 to 9 April 2015. Since 14 September 2015 he is the Minister of Health and Labor.

In March 2017, Ossinovski chaired the first ever gathering of the Party of European Socialists’ health ministers.

In April 2018, Ossinovski announced that he would step down as minister in order to focus on the party ahead of the 2019 parliamentary election. On 2 May 2018, his cabinet position was passed to Riina Sikkut. After the Social Democratic Party suffered a loss in the election and was left in the opposition, Ossinovski announced that he would stand down as the leader of the party.

References

External links
 

Living people
1986 births
Social Democratic Party (Estonia) politicians
Leaders of political parties in Estonia
Estonian people of Russian descent
Government ministers of Estonia
People from Kohtla-Järve
21st-century Estonian politicians
Members of the Riigikogu, 2011–2015
Members of the Riigikogu, 2015–2019
Members of the Riigikogu, 2023–2027